The Montana Republican Party (MTGOP) is the affiliate of the Republican Party in Montana. It is headquartered in Helena.

The party is chaired by Don Kaltschmidt. The national committeeman is currently unknown and the national committeewoman is Debra Lamm. The party is a private corporation organized of political organizations, including political action, advocacy, and interest groups. It is currently the dominant party in the state, controlling both of Montana's U.S. House seats, one of the U.S. Senate seats, both houses of the state legislature, and the governorship.

Current party officers

Current elected officials

The Montana Republican party controls all the six statewide offices and holds majorities in the Montana House of Representatives and Senate. They also hold one U.S. Senate seat and both congressional districts.

Members of Congress

U.S. Senate

U.S. House of Representatives

Statewide offices

Legislative leaders

31 Members of the Montana Senate

67 Members of the Montana House of Representatives

Platform
The Montana Republican Party Platform was adopted June 16, 2012 and can be viewed in its entirety on the Montana Republican Party website.

Conventions
According to Party Bylaws, conventions that are held within the state. The State Platform convention, which meets once every even-numbered year between the primary and general elections, the purpose of this convention, is to adopt a state platform. There is a State Delegate Convention, which meets every presidential year prior to the Republican National Committee; during this convention they elect the delegates and alternate delegates to the Republican National Convention. Then there is the State Officer's Convention, which meets in June each odd-numbered year, this is when the state chairman and state vice chairman are elected. These conventions are given notice by convention calls and they give notice to all meetings or conventions. There is a quorum for any business actions and are entitled to vote thereat, in person, or by proxy, and weighted votes are not considered. Proxies are allowed except when selecting delegates for the national convention. Voting is an individual basis and are only for people entitled to vote at the conventions. The Parliamentary practice is Roberts' Rules of Order, it governs all conventions and meetings and allows the state chairman to appoint a parliamentarian for any State Central Committee meeting or convention.

Committees
State Central Committee is made up by the county chairman, state committeemen and committee women, and finance chairman for each county. This committee is the governing body the Montana GOP and makes up all the rules and policies for the state party.
State Executive Committee is made up of many members such as state chairman, vice chairman, national committeeman and committeewoman, statewide elected federal and state officeholders, elected Republican Public Service Commissioners, the highest-ranking Republican leader from state Senate and House of Representatives, and many other Republican groups or clubs within Montana. The main purpose of this committee is to execute policies and programs of the Montana GOP between the State Central Committees. The terms of these members last as long as the chairman's term and can also end by resignation or removal.
County Central Committee is found in each county in Montana and only consists of elected or appointed committeemen and committeewomen from each precinct of the county and hold officer for two years. The committee elects county chairman and vice chairman, secretary and treasurer, state and Congressional committeeman and committee woman, finance chairman, and anything else that seems important. It can adopt its own rules and come up with a county executive committee that executes the counties rules and policies. 
There are also other committees such as the Rules Committee. The members are appointed by the chairman and they consider or recommend rules and rule changes. Any other special committee such as the Rules Committee can be appointed by the chairman if needed.

Elected officers
Chairman is the leader of the party and is responsible of the hiring and firing of any employees. The chairman can appoint all committees except the executive committee. The chairman has the power of supervision and management. The chairman also works with the treasurer to make sure the right resources are provided. 
Vice chairman performs all the duties assigned by the chairman. 
Secretary keeps the minutes for all meetings and anything assigned by the chairman.
Treasurer controls the financial record keeping and practices of the party.
Assistant treasurer is there to become familiar with the responsibilities of the treasurer and will perform any duties assigned by the chairman and treasurer.

Appointed officers
Executive director is appointed by the chairman after approval from the executive committee. The main duty is to preserve all permanent records of the State Central Committee and any other duty assigned by the chairman. 
finance chairman is appointed exactly like the executive director. The main duty of this officer is to raise funds for the Republican Party.

General Counsel is also appointed the same way as the first two officers. The main duty of the General Counsel is to advise the chairman, State Central Committee, and all other officers and committees on all legal matters. The General Counsel is licensed to practice law within the state.

There can be other types of officers that are appointed by the chairman. These types are only appointed if needed for a particular purpose.

Nominations
The State Central Committee will appoint a nominee to fill a vacancy for a party candidate and the person who receives the most votes is the nominee.  If one or two Congressional Districts for the state need to be filled, a committee appointed by the County Central Committee will make the appointment and the person with the most votes wins the nomination. The votes entitled to the certain members shall be weighted by comparing the Republican primary vote in each county and the Republican primary vote for the office being voted for. For each two percent or less of the total vote, there are four votes awarded to the county. Anything higher than two percent will be awarded an extra vote. The delegates at the meetings will divide the votes to each county and then the delegates will individually cast their votes.

Voting trends

Montana is considered to be a moderately Republican state. There is a small percentage of Hispanic and African American votes. There is a significant number of votes from the Native American population as well. Montana has voted Republican in almost every single presidential election after the national Democratic landslide of 1964, with the sole exception of Bill Clinton's narrow plurality victory in 1992. Republican presidential candidate Donald Trump won Montana in 2020 with 56.9% of the total statewide vote over Democrat Joe Biden, who received 40.5%.

As of 2021/2022 the Montana Senate has a Republican majority with thirty-one of the fifty seats and a majority in the Montana House of Representatives with sixty-seven of the one hundred seats.

Historical figures

Benjamin Potts

Potts was a Republican governor of Montana Territory who worked with Democrat political and business leaders to sustain a successful program of financial responsibility and economy of government during a boom period in Montana's territorial era. He was the longest-serving territorial governor in U.S. history.

Wilbur F. Sanders
Sanders was a lawyer, Civil War veteran that was considered to be known as the essence of Montana Republicanism.

Jeannette Rankin

Rankin was a Republican from Montana and was also an important figure with the women's suffrage movement. Her efforts were rewarded when Montana gave women the right to vote in 1914. In 1916 she was the first woman to be elected to Congress. During her term in Congress she voted against U.S. entry in World War I. She left Congress in 1919 but was reelected in 1940. Once again she voted for peace and opposed U.S. entry in World War II.

Election results

Presidential

Gubernatorial

See also

 Political party strength in Montana
 United States presidential election in Montana, 2008
 Montana Democratic Party
 Montana Libertarian Party

References

External links
 Montana Republican Party
 Montana Federation of College Republicans
 Montana Young Republican Professionals

Republican Party
Montana